Ös may refer to:

Ös language, a Turkic language of Russia
öS, the currency sign of the Austrian schilling